The Stadler WINK (Wandelbarer Innovativer Nahverkehrs-Kurzzug [English translation: convertible, innovative short train for local transport]) is a hybrid multiple unit railcar designed and built by Stadler Rail of Switzerland that entered service in 2021.

Service history
The WINK was unveiled in November 2017 when European operator Arriva announced an order for 18 trainsets, which it planned to place in service in the northern Netherlands beginning in 2020.

Upon delivery, repair and maintenance of the trainsets will be performed by Stadler in Leeuwarden through 2035. The first trainsets were put into service on 12 April 2021.

Design

The WINK is a derivative design of Stadler's FLIRT railcars that is intended for service on lightly travelled lines.  It has an aluminium carbody that can be customized in length by the customer, and can be powered by either diesel or electric powertrains with supplemental on board batteries. Arriva units will be delivered with Deutz diesel engines, running on vegetable oil fuel, and batteries charged by regenerative braking; the engines are planned to be replaced by additional batteries once electrification is installed over part of their route. Each trainset can carry about 275 passengers, with seating for 150, and has a top speed of up to  depending on customer specification.

References

Stadler Rail multiple units
Multiple units of the Netherlands
Hybrid vehicles